Calomarde can refer to:

 Francisco Tadeo Calomarde y Arría (1775), Spanish statesman.
 Calomarde, Aragon, a municipality in Spain